In chemistry, the bromine number is the amount of bromine in grams absorbed by  of a sample. The number indicates the degree of unsaturation.

The bromine number is useful as a measure of aliphatic unsaturation in gasoline samples. The California ARB, in its Motor Vehicle Fuels Compliance Assistance Program, indicated that every unit of bromine number is equivalent to twice the percentage point of olefin content in gasoline. So, a gasoline with bromine number 30 would have an olefin content of not more than 15 vol%. One refinery compiled a year's worth of data on bromine number and the corresponding olefin content of gasoline. The data showed that the bromine number of gasoline is about 2.4 times the olefin content. A gasoline with bromine number of 30 would then have an olefin content of about 12.5 percent by volume, which is slightly lower than ARB's assumption, but still is higher than the CaRFG maximum limit of 10 percent by volume.

The bromine number is usually determined by electrochemical titration, where bromine is generated in situ with the redox process of potassium bromide and bromate in an acidic solution, using a mercury catalyst to ensure the complete bromination of all olefins.

The bromine number is similar to the iodine number. It can be calculated as an equivalent to the iodine value by multiplying it by the atomic weight of  divided by the atomic weight of :

Related test methods
 Acid value
 Epoxy value
 Hydroxyl value
 Iodine value
 Peroxide value
 Saponification value

See also
 Bromatometry

References
 ASTM method

Bromine